Catherine of Braganza (25 November 1638 – 31 December 1705) was Queen of England, Scotland and Ireland during her marriage to King Charles II, which lasted from 21 May 1662 until his death on 6 February 1685. She was the daughter of John IV of Portugal, who became the first king from the House of Braganza in 1640 after overthrowing the 60–year rule of the Spanish Habsburgs over Portugal and restoring the Portuguese throne which had first been created in 1143. Catherine served as regent of Portugal during the absence of her brother Peter II in 1701 and during 1704–1705, after her return to her homeland as a widow.

Owing to her devotion to the Roman Catholic faith in which she had been raised, Catherine was unpopular in England. She was a special object of attack by the inventors of the Popish Plot. In 1678 the murder of Edmund Berry Godfrey was ascribed to her servants, and Titus Oates accused her of an intention to poison the king. These charges, the absurdity of which was soon shown by cross-examination, nevertheless placed Catherine for some time in great danger. On 28 November 1678, Oates accused Catherine of high treason, and the English House of Commons passed an order for the removal of her and of all Roman Catholics from the Palace of Whitehall. Several further depositions were made against her, and in June 1679 it was decided that she should stand trial, which threat however was lifted by the king's intervention, for which she later showed him much gratitude.

Catherine produced no heirs for Charles, having suffered three miscarriages. Her husband kept many mistresses, most notably Barbara Palmer, 1st Duchess of Cleveland, whom Catherine was forced to accept as one of her Ladies of the Bedchamber. By his mistresses, Charles fathered many children, which he acknowledged.

Early life and family

Catherine was born at the Ducal Palace of Vila Viçosa as the second surviving daughter of John, 8th Duke of Braganza, and his wife, Luisa de Guzmán. Following the Portuguese Restoration War, her father was acclaimed King John IV of Portugal on 1 December 1640. With her father's new position as one of Europe's most important monarchs, Portugal then possessing the widespread colonial Portuguese Empire, Catherine became a prime choice for a wife for European royalty, and she was proposed as a bride for John of Austria, the duc de Beaufort, Louis XIV of France and Charles II of England. The consideration for the final choice was due to her being seen as a useful conduit for contracting an alliance between Portugal and England after the Treaty of the Pyrenees of 1659, in which Portugal was arguably abandoned by France. Despite her country's ongoing struggle with Spain, Catherine enjoyed a happy, contented childhood in her beloved Lisbon.

Commonly regarded as the power behind the throne, Queen Luisa was also a devoted mother who took an active interest in her children's upbringing and personally supervised her daughter's education. Catherine is believed to have spent most of her youth in a convent close by the royal palace where she remained under the watchful eye of her protective mother. It appears to have been a very sheltered upbringing, with one contemporary remarking that Catherine, "was bred hugely retired" and "hath hardly been ten times out of the palace in her life". Catherine's older sister Joana, Princess of Beira, died in 1653, leaving Catherine as the eldest surviving child of her parents. Her husband was chosen by Luisa, who acted as regent of her country following her husband's death in 1656.

Marriage

Negotiations for the marriage began during the reign of King Charles I and were renewed immediately after the Restoration. On 23 June 1661, in spite of Spanish opposition, the marriage contract was signed. England secured Tangier (in North Africa) and the Seven Islands of Bombay (in India), trading privileges in Brazil and the Portuguese East Indies, religious and commercial freedom for English residents in Portugal, and two million Portuguese crowns (about £300,000). In return, Portugal obtained English military and naval support (which would prove to be decisive) in her fight against Spain and liberty of worship for Catherine. She arrived at Portsmouth on the evening of 13–14 May 1662, but was not visited there by Charles until 20 May. The following day the couple were married at Portsmouth in two ceremonies – a Catholic one conducted in secret, followed by a public Anglican service.

On 30 September 1662, the married couple entered London as part of a large procession, which included the Portuguese delegation and many members of the court. There were also minstrels and musicians, among them ten playing shawms and twelve playing Portuguese bagpipes, those being the new Queen's favourite instruments. The procession continued over a large bridge, especially designed and built for the occasion, which led into the palace where Henrietta Maria, the Queen Mother, waited along with the English court and nobility. This was followed by feasting and firework displays.

Catherine possessed several good qualities, but had been brought up in a convent, secluded from the world, and was scarcely a wife Charles would have chosen for himself. Her mother-in-law, the Queen Mother, was pleased with her, and wrote that she is "the best creature in the world, from whom I have so much affection, I have the joy to see the King love her extremely. She is a Saint!" In reality, her marriage was plagued by infidelities on Charles's side.

Little is known of Catherine's own thoughts on the match. While her mother plotted to secure an alliance with England and thus support Portugal's fight for independence, and her future husband celebrated his restoration by dallying with his mistresses, Catherine's time had been spent in the sombre seclusion of her convent home, with little opportunity for fun or frivolity. Even outside the convent, her actions were governed by the strict etiquette of the royal court of Portugal. By all accounts, Catherine grew into a quiet, even-tempered young woman.

Catherine became pregnant and miscarried at least three times, and during a severe illness in 1663, she imagined, for a time, that she had given birth. Charles comforted her by telling her she had indeed given birth to two sons and a daughter. Her position was a difficult one, and though Charles continued to have children by his many mistresses, he insisted she be treated with respect, and sided with her against his mistresses when he felt that she was not receiving due respect. After her three miscarriages, it seemed to be more and more unlikely that the queen would bear an heir. Royal advisors urged the monarch to seek a divorce, hoping that the new wife would be Protestant and fertile – but Charles refused. This eventually led to her being made a target by courtiers. Throughout his reign, Charles firmly dismissed the idea of divorcing Catherine, and she remained faithful to Charles throughout their marriage.

Queen consort (1662–1685) 
Catherine was not a particularly popular choice of queen, since she was a Roman Catholic. Her religion prevented her from being crowned, as Roman Catholics were forbidden to take part in Anglican services. She initially faced hardships due to the language barrier, the king's infidelities and the political conflicts between Roman Catholics and Anglicans. Over time, her quiet decorum, loyalty and genuine affection for Charles changed the public's perception of her.

Although her difficulties with the English language persisted, as time went on, the once rigidly formal Portuguese Infanta mellowed and began to enjoy some of the more innocent pleasures of the court. She loved to play cards and shocked devout Protestants by playing on Sundays. She enjoyed dancing and took great delight in organising masques. She had a great love for the countryside and picnics; fishing and archery were also favourite pastimes. In 1670, on a trip to Audley End with her ladies-in-waiting, the once chronically shy Catherine attended a country fair disguised as a village maiden, but was soon discovered and, due to the large crowds, forced to make a hasty retreat. And when in 1664 her favourite painter, Jacob Huysmans, a Flemish Catholic, painted her as St Catherine, it promptly set a trend among court ladies.

She did not involve herself in English politics, instead she kept up an active interest in her native country. Anxious to re-establish good relations with the pope and perhaps gain recognition for Portuguese independence, she sent Richard Bellings, later her principal secretary, to Rome with letters for the pope and several cardinals. In 1669 she involved herself in the last-ditch effort to relieve Candia in Crete, which was under siege by the Ottoman Empire and whose cause Rome was promoting, although she failed to persuade her husband to take any action. In 1670, as a sign of her rising favour with the then-new Pope Clement X, she requested and was granted devotional objects. The same year, Charles II ordered the building of a Royal yacht HMY Saudadoes for her, used for pleasure trips on the River Thames and to maintain communications with the Queen's homeland of Portugal, making the journey twice.

Catherine fainted when Charles's official mistress, Barbara Palmer was presented to her. Charles insisted on making Palmer Catherine's Lady of the Bedchamber. After this incident, Catherine withdrew from spending time with the king, declaring she would return to Portugal rather than openly accept the arrangement with Palmer. Clarendon failed to convince her to change her mind. Charles then dismissed nearly all the members of Catherine's Portuguese retinue, after which she stopped actively resisting, which pleased the king, however she participated very little in court life and activities.

Catholicism

Though known to keep her faith a private matter, her religion and proximity to the king made her the target of anti-Catholic sentiment. Catherine occupied herself with her faith. Her piety was widely known and was a characteristic in his wife that the King greatly admired; in his letters to his sister, Catherine's devoutness is described almost with awe. Her household contained between four and six priests, and in 1665, Catherine decided to build a religious house east of St James's to be occupied by thirteen Portuguese Franciscans of the order of St Peter of Alcantara. It was completed by 1667 and would become known as The Friary.

In 1675 the stress of a possible revival of the divorce project indirectly led to another illness, which Catherine's physicians claimed and her husband cannot fail to have noted, was "due as much to mental as physical causes". In the same year, all Irish and English Catholic priests were ordered to leave the country, which left Catherine dependent upon foreign priests. As increasingly harsher measures were put in place against Catholics, Catherine appointed her close friend and adviser, the devoutly Catholic Francisco de Mello, former Portuguese Ambassador to England, as her Lord Chamberlain. It was an unusual and controversial move but "wishing to please Catherine and perhaps demonstrate the futility of moves for divorce, the King granted his permission. De Mello was dismissed the following year for ordering the printing of a Catholic book, leaving the beleaguered Catherine even more isolated at court". One consolation was that Louise de Kérouaille, Duchess of Portsmouth, who replaced Barbara Palmer as reigning mistress, always treated the Queen with proper deference; the Queen in return showed her gratitude by using her own influence to protect Louise during the Popish Plot.

Popish plot

The Test Act of 1673 had driven all Catholics out of public office, and anti-Catholic feelings intensified in the years to come. Although she was not active in religious politics, in 1675 Catherine was criticised for supposedly supporting the idea of appointing a bishop to England who, it was hoped, would resolve the internal disputes of Catholics. Critics also noted the fact that, despite orders to the contrary, English Catholics attended her private chapel.

As the highest-ranking Catholic in the country, Catherine was an obvious target for Protestant extremists, and it was hardly surprising that the Popish Plot of 1678 would directly threaten her position. However, Catherine was completely secure in her husband's favour ("she could never do anything wicked, and it would be a horrible thing to abandon her" he told Gilbert Burnet), and the House of Lords, most of whom knew her and liked her, refused by an overwhelming majority to impeach her. Relations between the royal couple became notably warmer: Catherine wrote of Charles's "wonderful kindness" to her and it was noted that his visits to her quarters became longer and more frequent.

Later life and death

During Charles's final illness in 1685, she showed anxiety about his reconciliation with the Roman Catholic faith, and she exhibited great grief at his death. When he lay dying in 1685, he asked for Catherine, but she sent a message asking that her presence be excused and "to beg his pardon if she had offended him all his life." He answered, "Alas poor woman! she asks for my pardon? I beg hers with all my heart; take her back that answer." Later in the same year, she unsuccessfully interceded with James II for the life of James Scott, 1st Duke of Monmouth, Charles's illegitimate son and leader of the Monmouth Rebellion – even though Monmouth in rebellion had called upon the support represented by the staunch Protestants opposed to the Catholic Church.

Catherine remained in England, living at Somerset House, through the reign of James and his deposition in the Glorious Revolution by William III and Mary II. She remained in England partly because of a protracted lawsuit against her former Lord Chamberlain, Henry Hyde, 2nd Earl of Clarendon, over money that she claimed as part of her allowance and that he claimed was part of the perquisite of his office. Catherine's fondness for money is one of the more unexpected features of her character: her brother-in-law James,  who was himself notably avaricious, remarked that she always drove a hard bargain.

Initially on good terms with William and Mary, her position deteriorated as the practice of her religion led to misunderstandings and increasing isolation. A bill was introduced to Parliament to limit the number of Catherine's Catholic servants, and she was warned not to agitate against the government.

She finally returned to Portugal in March 1692. According to Louis de Rouvroy, duc de Saint-Simon, in her widowhood she secretly married his relation Louis de Duras, 2nd Earl of Feversham, despite the earl being a lifelong Protestant. 

In 1703, she supported the Methuen Treaty between Portugal and England. She acted as regent for her brother, Peter II, in 1701 and 1704–05.  She died at the Bemposta Palace in Lisbon on 31 December 1705 and was buried at the Monastery of São Vicente de Fora Lisbon.

Legacy
Catherine is often credited with popularizing tea drinking in Britain,   which was uncommon in her time. Beyond tea, her arrival brought and promulgated goods such as cane, lacquer, cottons, and porcelain.

Queens, a borough of New York City, was supposedly named after Catherine of Braganza since she was queen when Queens County was established in 1683. Queens' naming is consistent with those of Kings County (the borough of Brooklyn, originally named after her husband, King Charles II) and Richmond County (the borough of Staten Island, named after his illegitimate son, the 1st Duke of Richmond). However, there is no historical evidence that Queens County was named in her honour, neither is there a document from the time proclaiming it so. Some written histories of Queens skip over the monarch entirely and make no mention of her. 

After the tri-centennial of the establishment of Queens County in 1983, the Portuguese-American "Friends of Queen Catherine" society began raising money to erect a 35-foot statue of Queen Catherine on the East River waterfront in Long Island City. Audrey Flack was hired by the society to serve as the sculptor of the proposed statue, and the project received support from several notable public figures in New York City, including Claire Shulman and Donald Trump. However, the project was well into development when opposition to the statue arose from multiple parties; historians objected to the statue on the grounds that there was no evidence that Queens was actually named after her, and thought that the location of the proposed statue was misplaced. Meanwhile, the African-American Bethesda Missionary Baptist Church opposed plans for the statue after allegations that Queen Catherine and the House of Braganza had profited from the slave trade emerged, while Irish-Americans in Queens were upset that the proposed statue would eclipse the Calvary Cemetery, which had been established for the Irish immigrant community in the United States. As a result of this public opposition, Shulman was forced to withdraw her support, and the statue was never erected. A quarter-scale model survives at the site of Expo '98 in Lisbon, Portugal, facing west across the Atlantic.

Catherine Street, formerly Brydges Street, in central London is named after her.

Novelists, notably Margaret Campbell Barnes in With All My Heart, Jean Plaidy in her Charles II trilogy and Susanna Gregory in her Thomas Chaloner mystery novels, usually portray the Queen in a sympathetic light. So did Alison Macleod in her 1976 biography of the queen, The Portingale and Isabel Stilwell in her 2008 historical novel Catherine of Braganza – The courage of a Portuguese Infanta who became Queen of England. 

Catherine's marriage had an important result for the later history of India and of the British Empire, though the Queen personally had little to do with it: soon after acquiring the Seven Islands of Bombay as part of her dowry, Charles II rented them to the East India Company which moved its Presidency there – resulting in Bombay/Mumbai eventually growing to become one of the main cities of India.

Arms
The royal arms of the British monarch are impaled with the royal arms of her father. For supporters, she used the crowned lion of England on the dexter side, and on the sinister, the wyvern Vert of Portugal.

Ancestry

See also
List of English consorts
History of tea in the United Kingdom

References

Sources

Further reading

Plaidy, Jean. (2008). The Merry Monarch's Wife: The Story of Catherine of Braganza. Broadway. 
Plaidy, Jean. (2005). The Loves of Charles II: The Stuart Saga. Broadway. 

Koen, Karleen. (2006). Dark Angels. Broadway.  

Sousa, Manuel E. (1995). Catherine of Braganza. Howell Press Inc. 
Elsna, Hebe. (1967). Catherine of Braganza : Charles II's Queen. Hale.
Mackay, Janet. (1937).Catherine of Braganza.  J. Long, Limited; First Edition.
Barnes, Margaret Campbell. (1951). With All My Heart: The Love Story of Catherine of Braganza. Macrae-Smith Company.

External links

|-

 
1638 births
1705 deaths
18th-century viceregal rulers
18th-century women rulers
17th-century Portuguese women
18th-century Portuguese women
17th-century English women
18th-century English women 
17th-century Portuguese people
18th-century Portuguese people
18th-century English people
Court of Charles II of England
English people of Portuguese descent
English Roman Catholics
English royal consorts
Scottish royal consorts
Irish royal consorts
House of Braganza
House of Stuart
People from Lisbon
People from Vila Viçosa
People associated with the Popish Plot
Portuguese Roman Catholics
Portuguese royalty
Princesses of Portugal
Regents of Portugal
Burials at the Monastery of São Vicente de Fora
Royal reburials
Daughters of kings
Women who experienced pregnancy loss
Female regents